Kangtega, known also as The Snow Saddle, is a major mountain peak of the Himalayas in Nepal. Its summit rises . It was first ascended in 1963.

From the Khumbhu and Hinku Valley areas, Mount Kangtega rises to a saddle-shaped point; thus, the feature earned the name "The Snow Saddle."

Notable ascents and attempts

 1986 Northeast Buttress, alpine-style FA of route by Jay Smith, Mark Hesse, Craig Reason and Paul 'Wally' Teare, Oct 22-29.

References

Mountains of Koshi Province
Six-thousanders of the Himalayas